Sally Wen Mao (born in Wuhan, China) is an American poet. She won a 2017 Pushcart Prize.

Life 

She grew up in Boston and the Bay Area. She graduated from Carnegie Mellon University with a BFA and Cornell University, with an MFA.

Her work has appeared in A Public Space, Poetry Magazine, Bomb, Diagram, Four Way Review, Indiana Review, Kenyon Review, Missouri Review, Muzzle, Superstitution, and Washington Square Review. Her first book of poems, Mad Honey Symposium, was published by Alice James Books in 2014, and her second book, Oculus, was published by Graywolf Press in 2019. Oculus has been reviewed by The New Yorker.

From 2016 to 2017, she was a fellow at the Cullman Center for Writers and Scholars at The New York Public Library.

From 2017 to 2018, she was Jenny McKean Moore Writer-in-Residence at George Washington University.

Sally is a Kundiman fellow.

Works 

 Mad Honey Symposium  Alice James Books, 2014. 
 Oculus, Graywolf Press, 2019. ,

References

External links 

 

Year of birth missing (living people)
Living people
Cornell University alumni
Writers from Wuhan
21st-century Chinese poets
21st-century American poets
Chinese women poets
American women poets
21st-century American women writers
Poets from Hubei